Shoot First may refer to:

Shoot first law, or stand-your-ground law, a legal doctrine on justifiable use of force in self-defense
Rough Shoot, also known as Shoot First, 1953 British film
Shoot First, Die Later, 1974 Italian film
Shoot First... Ask Questions Later, or The White, the Yellow, and the Black, 1975 Italian film
Harry Benson: Shoot First, a 2016 documentary
Han shot first, controversial change made to a scene in Star Wars Episode IV: A New Hope